Sazes do Lorvão is a parish in Penacova Municipality, Portugal. The population in 2011 was 749, in an area of 17.86 km².

References

External links
 Website 

Freguesias of Penacova